Heinrich Windelen (25 June 1921 – 16 February 2015) was a German politician of the Christian Democratic Union. He served as a Member of the Bundestag from 1957 to 1990, and as Federal Minister for Displaced Persons, Refugees and War Victims in the Cabinet Kiesinger in 1969 and as Federal Minister of Intra-German Relations in the Cabinet Kohl II from 1983 to 1987.

Life and career
Windelen was born in Bolkenhain, Silesia (now Bolków, Poland), the third of eight children of Engelbert and Anna Windelen. His father was an active member of the Zentrumspartei and the Reichsbanner Schwarz-Rot-Gold. Former Chancellor Joseph Wirth visited Windelen's family several times. Windelen passed his Abitur in 1939 in Striegau and was drafted to the mandatory Reichsarbeitsdienst. In 1940, he began studying  physics and chemistry at the University of Breslau.

In 1941, he was conscripted into the Wehrmacht and became a POW in 1945 with the rank of a Feldwebel. Notably, he did not become an officer because of his distance to the Nazi regime.

He came as a refugee to West Germany following The Expulsion in 1945, and became a member of the CDU in 1946. Windelen was a member of the Bundestags from 1957 to 1990. In 1969, he became Federal Minister for the Expellees. Windelen was Vice-president of the Bundestages (1981–1983) and Bundesminister for intra-German relations (1983–1987). He was honorary chairman of CDU in North Rhine-Westphalia. He died at the age of 93 on 16 February 2015.

Honours 
 1969: Grand Cross of the Order of Merit of the Federal Republic of Germany

Publications 
SOS für Europa, Stuttgart, Seewald-Verlag, 1972, 
Der Haushaltsausschuß im politischen Prozeß, in: Verwaltung und Fortbildung, Jg. 1978, Heft 3, Seiten 93 bis 100.
Strukturveränderungen in der öffentlichen Finanzwirtschaft. Geldpolitik und Haushaltspolitik, in: Geld und Währung, Bonn 1979, Seiten 55 bis 61.
Das Parlament zwischen Ausgabenfreude und Haushaltskontrolle, in: Günter Triesch, Staatsfinanzen und Wirtschaft, Köln 1981, Seiten 111 bis 130.

Literature 
 Rudolf Vierhaus und Ludolf Herbst (Hrsg.): Biographisches Handbuch der Mitglieder des Deutschen Bundestages 1949–2002. Band 2, N–Z, Saur, München 2002, S. 960

External links 

 

1921 births
2015 deaths
People from Jawor County
People from the Province of Silesia
University of Breslau alumni
Members of the Bundestag for North Rhine-Westphalia
Members of the Bundestag 1987–1990
Members of the Bundestag 1983–1987
Members of the Bundestag 1980–1983
Members of the Bundestag 1976–1980
Members of the Bundestag 1972–1976
Members of the Bundestag 1969–1972
Members of the Bundestag 1965–1969
Members of the Bundestag 1961–1965
Members of the Bundestag 1957–1961
Members of the Bundestag 1953–1957
Federal government ministers of Germany
Knights Commander of the Order of Merit of the Federal Republic of Germany
German prisoners of war in World War II
Members of the Bundestag for the Christian Democratic Union of Germany
Reich Labour Service members
German Army soldiers of World War II